Begonia geminiflora is a species of plant in the family Begoniaceae. It is endemic to Ecuador as well as known from a population in Pichincha province recorded in 1980. Its natural habitat is subtropical or tropical moist montane forests. It is threatened by habitat loss.

References

geminiflora
Endemic flora of Ecuador
Vulnerable plants
Taxonomy articles created by Polbot
Plants described in 1979